Lawrence Academy may refer to:

 Lawrence Academy (Groton, Massachusetts), Groton, Massachusetts (private, secondary, boarding school).
 Lawrence Academy (North Carolina), Merry Hill, North Carolina (private, day school, K–12).
 Lawrence Academy (Falmouth, Massachusetts), a heritage building in Falmouth, Massachusetts.